Fraternity Row is a 1977 American drama film portraying life in a 1950s fraternity at a fictional college.

Plot

College students pledge the Gamma Nu Pi fraternity at a fictional college and endure common hazing practices such as humiliation, forced eating of onions and severe paddlings.

Cast
 Peter Fox as Rodger Carter
 Gregory Harrison as Zac Sterling
 Scott Newman as Chunk Cherry
 Nancy Morgan as Jennifer Harris
 Wendy Phillips as Betty Ann Martin
 Robert Emhardt as Brother Bob Abernathy
 Cliff Robertson as The Narrator
 Dean Smith as Andy Nelson

Development
The film was originally Charles Gary Allison's thesis as a film student at the University of Southern California. It is said to have been inspired by the 1959 hazing of Kappa Sigma pledge Richard Swanson, who died after attempting to swallow a large piece of raw liver without chewing.

Reception

Fraternity Row met with generally positive reviews, but the film saw very light business at the box office.

The film has not been released on DVD, although it was briefly available on VHS cassette in the early 1980s.

See also
List of hazing deaths in the United States
Hazing
History of North American college fraternities and sororities
Matt's Law
The Gordie Foundation

References

External links
 
 

1977 films
1970s coming-of-age drama films
American coming-of-age drama films
Films about fraternities and sororities
Films about hazing
Films set in 1954
Paramount Pictures films
1977 directorial debut films
1977 drama films
1970s English-language films
1970s American films